The common slope dragonet (Draconetta xenica) is a species of slope dragonet native to the Indo-Pacific region where it can be found from Africa to the Hawaiian Islands. This species grows to a length of  SL. This species is the only known member of its genus.

References

Draconettidae
Monotypic fish genera
Fish described in 1903
Taxa named by David Starr Jordan